The Tongliao–Ranghulu railway or Tongrang Railway, is a railroad in northeastern China, between Tongliao station in Inner Mongolia and Daqing west station (formerly Ranghulu station) on the Harbin–Manzhouli railway in Heilongjiang Province. The line was built from 1964 to 1966. Major cities and towns along route include Tongliao, Da'an, and Daqing.

Electrification of the railway was completed in 2018.

Rail connections
 Ranghulu (Daqing): Harbin–Manzhouli railway
Taipingchuan: Siping–Qiqihar railway
 Tongliao: Beijing–Tongliao railway, Jining–Tongliao railway

See also
 List of railways in China
Rail transport in Inner Mongolia

References

Railway lines in China
Rail transport in Inner Mongolia
Rail transport in Jilin
Rail transport in Heilongjiang